The Judo competition at the 1990 Asian Games was contested in sixteen weight classes, eight each for men and women.

Medalists

Men

Women

Medal table

References 

 New Straits Times, October 12–16, 1994

External links
 
 Olympic Council of Asia

 
1990 Asian Games events
1990
Asian Games
1990 Asian Games